Lev Tolstoy (1828–1910) was a Russian author.

Lev Tolstoy may also refer to:

 Lev Tolstoy (film), 1984 Soviet film about the author
 Lev Tolstoy (rural locality), a settlement in Russia
 Lev Tolstoy (ship), Soviet and Russian cruise ship

See also 

 Lev (given name)
Lev Lvovich Tolstoy born 1869, Russian writer and fourth child of Lev Tolstoy
 Tolstoy family